Order of the Black is the eighth studio album by American heavy metal band Black Label Society. It was released in North America on August 10, 2010, through E1 Music. In New Zealand and Australia, it was released by Riot Entertainment (with special cover art) and in Europe through Roadrunner Records.

Release
The first single "Parade of the Dead" was released on June 16. The second single of the album entitled "Crazy Horse" was released next day via iTunes.

On August 9, 2010, Order of the Black was premiered at Rockline Radio, hosted by Bob Coburn. The same date, the album was posted to AOL music for streaming in its entirety (minus bonus tracks). Although various versions in different territories and formats carried different bonus tracks, all available bonus tracks are actually taken from the 2011 album The Song Remains Not the Same.

On August 23, 2010, the band was scheduled to perform Order of the Black at the Orange County Choppers show.

On August 29, 2010, Black Label Society announced ringtones from their album Order of the Black.

Target released an exclusive edition of the album with a 50-minute bonus DVD for a limited time. The DVD features "Trakk by Trakk with Zakk", a song-by-song overview of the album where Zakk Wylde talks about his lyrical and musical inspiration for the songs. It will also feature a solo performance of the song "The Last Goodbye" from the 2006 Shot to Hell album and an exclusive tour of the BLS Bunker. This is the only studio album with drummer Will Hunt.

Order of the Black sold around 33,000 copies in the United States in its first week of release to enter the Billboard 200 chart at position number 4. The album also made a Top 10 debut in Canada, landing at #9 on Canadian album charts.

Track listing

Personnel
Black Label Society
Zakk Wylde – guitars, lead vocals, piano
John DeServio – bass, backing vocals
Will Hunt – drums

Production
Produced by Zakk Wylde
Associate producer – John DeServio
Engineered by Adam Klumpp
Mixed by Zakk Wylde, John DeServio, Adam Klumpp
Mastered by George Marino
Management – Bob Ringe (Survival Management)
Publicity – Carise Yatter (Hired Gun Media), Darren Edwards
Marketing, Internet – Jim Baltutis (Concepts in Concert), Denner Vieira, Angela McGill
Artwork, layout, and design – John Irwin (John Irwin Design), Zakk Wylde

Charts

References

2010 albums
Black Label Society albums
MNRK Music Group albums
Roadrunner Records albums